Global Gaming Factory X AB was an advertising and software company based in Sweden that relies on Internet cafes and gaming venues as its medium. Global Gaming Factory X uses Smartlaunch and CyberCafePro's installed base of cafe management software at thousands of internet cafes and gaming centers around the world for digital distribution of advertising, software and services to the large groups of tourists at Internet cafes and the gamer community at gaming venues.

On 30 June 2009, Global Gaming Factory X announced its intention to buy the popular BitTorrent site The Pirate Bay. It also announced its intention to buy shares of Swedish P2P company Peerialism AB. Peerialism develops solutions for data distribution and distributed storage based on new P2P technology. The transaction was planned to take place in August 2009. Due to the buyers' financial troubles, the site was not sold.

One week prior to the announcement, trading in GGF's stock was shut down after an unusually large rise in the volume of trades. The company is suspected of insider trading. Global Gaming Factory X AB has been under receivership since the turn of the year 2011/2012.[5] The bankruptcy was closed on August 21, 2013.

References

External links 
 Peerialism AB 

Companies based in Stockholm
The Pirate Bay
Online companies of Sweden